The Crystal Submarine (French: Le sous marin de cristal) is a 1927 French silent drama film directed by Marcel Vandal and starring Tramel, Anna Lefeuvrier and André Dubosc.

Cast
 Tramel as Félicien Cassebois  
 Anna Lefeuvrier as Madame Cassebois  
 André Dubosc as Monsieur Guichard  
 Caprine as Madame Guichard 
 Georges Bever as Le fils de la concierge  
 Marcel Carpentier as Commissaire 
 Charles Chanot as Le directeur du combat  
 Léon Courtois
 Blanche Dauray as Mademoiselle Guichard  
 Gabrielle Fontan as La concierge  
 Jean Godard as Favières  
 René Lefèvre as Comte des Hurlettes  
 Marcel Maupi as Commissaire  
 Alexandre Mihalesco as Gustave Lenvolé

References

Bibliography
 Jay Robert Nash, Robert Connelly & Stanley Ralph Ross. Motion Picture Guide Silent Film 1910-1936. Cinebooks, 1988.

External links 
 

1927 films
French drama films
French silent films
1927 drama films
1920s French-language films
Films directed by Marcel Vandal
French black-and-white films
Silent drama films
1920s French films